Limbach Flugmotoren (Limbach Aero Engines) is a German company that produces aircraft engines.

History
The company is named after Peter Limbach who expanded his father's engine repair business in the 1970s in Königswinter. By May 2006, Limbach had produced more than 6000 engines.  The engines are certified according to CS-22 Subpart H for use in motorgliders, CS-LSA and CS-VLA type of aircraft.

Most Limbach  engines are based on the Volkswagen flat-4 boxer unit with displacement of up to 2.4 liters, and up to 160 BHP in the turbocharged model. The smaller engines, all 1700cc and some 2000cc, are based on the air cooled "Type 1" unit, also referred to as the Beetle engine. The larger engines, some 2000cc and all 2400cc, are based on the Wasserboxer. The most powerful versions of the 2400cc engines have water cooled cylinder heads as well as electronic fuel injection and electronic ignition. Limbach also makes two-stroke engines for UAV as well as uncertified versions of a few four-stroke engines for the experimental Homebuilt aircraft market. For most aviation enthusiasts though, Limbach is synonymous to the powerplant found in most German Motorgliders.

By late 2011 the company planned to close due to a worsened climate in which they were unable to operate. Allegedly an open letter dated 25 August 2011 could be found on their website, saying: "Years of ever increasing regulations and requirements have been choking us. Our efforts to operate in that environment were not successful because we cannot provide the necessary resources. Additionally there are government activities that hinder our current business and we cannot make plans for the future." Around the same time, Limbach was under investigation by German authorities for the unauthorized export of engines to Iran.

In late 2012 it was announced that the Limbachs assets had been sold to Mr. Chen Shuide who tends to continue producing Limbach engines with Peter Limbach still on board. As of April 2014, the company is still in business.

In September 2020, Germany's intelligence services reported that motors sold to Iran were found in drones used by Houthi rebels.

Products

4 Stroke certified engines
Limbach L 1700 - 59 to 67 HP
Limbach L 2000 - 75 to 80 HP
Limbach L 2400 - 93 to 130 HP

4 Stroke engines for experimental use
Limbach L 2400 DTX - 158 HP, Turbo

2 Stroke Engines for UAV
Limbach L 275E - 20 HP
Limbach L550E - 50 HP

Applications

References

External links
 

Aircraft engine manufacturers of Germany